Bumphen Luttimol (21 September 1930 – 28 October 2016) was a Thai footballer. He competed in the men's tournament at the 1956 Summer Olympics.

References

External links
 

1930 births
2016 deaths
Bumphen Luttimol
Bumphen Luttimol
Bumphen Luttimol
Footballers at the 1956 Summer Olympics
Bumphen Luttimol
Association football forwards